Cape Murray is a cape forming the western end of Murray Island just off the west coast of Pefaur (Ventimiglia) Peninsula in Graham Land, Antarctica, separating Hughes Bay to the northeast from Charlotte Bay to the south. First charted by the 1897-99 Belgian Antarctic Expedition under Lt. Adrien de Gerlache, and considered at the time as joined to the mainland. Named by Gerlache, presumably for Sir John Murray, British marine zoologist and oceanographer, an ardent advocate of Antarctic research.

Location

British mapping in 1978.

Map

 British Antarctic Territory.  Scale 1:200000 topographic map. DOS 610 Series, Sheet W 64 60.  Directorate of Overseas Surveys, Tolworth, UK, 1978.

References

 SCAR Composite Gazetteer of Antarctica.

Headlands of Graham Land
Danco Coast